The 2022 Uganda Cricket World Cup Challenge League B was the second round of matches in Group B of the 2019–2022 ICC Cricket World Cup Challenge League, a cricket tournament which formed part of the qualification pathway to the 2023 Cricket World Cup. All of the matches had List A status. The tournament took place in June 2022 in Uganda.

In October 2019, the International Cricket Council (ICC) confirmed that the Uganda Cricket Association (UGA) would host the tournament, with the series scheduled to take place between 3 and 13 August 2020. However, on 10 June 2020, the ICC confirmed that the tournament had been postponed due to the COVID-19 pandemic. In February 2022, the tournament was rescheduled for June 2022, with the fixtures announced in May 2022.

Jersey won all five of their matches in Uganda, to close the gap on Uganda and Hong Kong at the top of the group table. Conversely, Bermuda lost all five of their matches, resulting in them being eliminated from reaching the World Cup Qualifier Play-off.

Squads
The following squads were named for the tournament.

Fixtures

References

External links
 Series home at ESPN Cricinfo

International cricket competitions in 2022
International cricket competitions in Uganda
Uganda Cricket World Cup Challenge League B